Maria Kim (June 18, 1891 – March 13, 1944) was a Korean independence activist during the period of Japanese colonial rule (1910–1945). Her original name was Kim Jinsang (金眞常) and she also went by the name Kim Geunpo (金槿圃).

She was commemorated in a poem by fellow independence activist Yi Kwang-su. In 1968 she was posthumously awarded Korea's the Order of Independence Merit, and in 1992 was designated the Independence Activist of the Month for the month of July.

Biography

Early life
Maria Kim was the third child born to Yun-bang Kim and Mong-eun Kim, landowners in Jangyeon county in South Hwanghae province. Her father, Yun-bang, started attending church at an early age was an educational pioneer, establishing an elementary school in his hometown. However, he died while Maria Kim was young. Maria Kim later graduated from Sorae Normal School, the school that her father established, but soon afterward her mother also died, so she was left in uncle's care.

Maria Kim's household is well known for its nationalistic consciousness. Her uncle, Seo Byeongho and his son, Seo Jaehyeon were independence activists within the Provisional Government of the Republic of Korea, and Maria Kim was also the niece of independence activist Kim Sun-ae, who was the wife of Kim Gyusik. Her uncle Pilsun Kim, who graduated from Severance Medical School, would later become a close associate of Roh Baengin, Yu Dongyeol, Yi Dongyeo, and Kim Gyusik, who formed the provisional oppositional government. Thus while attending Yeondong Women's School, Maria Kim was influenced by the nationalistic consciousness of her uncle's household.

In 1910 Maria Kim graduated from Yeondong Women's School and worked at both at Yeondong and Sophia Women's School. In 1914 she departed as an exchange student to Japan, traveling to Tokyo via Hiroshima, and enrolled at Tokyo Women's Academy.

Korean Independence Activism
In 1919, shortly before graduating from Tokyo Women’s Academy, Kim actively participated with others, like Hwang Aedeok, in the independence movement that followed the promulgation of the February 8 Independence Declaration, a statement drafted by Korean foreign exchange students in Japan. When the March 1st Movement broke out later the same year, Kim, who had already returned to Korea, participated in anti-Japanese protest and was subsequently arrested and detained. During this period, she was subjected to torture, and she suffered health problems throughout her life as a result.

Maria Kim was sentenced to three years’ imprisonment for her involvement in the Korean Patriotic Women’s Association Incident, but because her permanent lesions from torture she was granted medical leave, and with the help of American missionaries escaped to Shanghai. In Shanghai, she became the representative of Hwanghae province, and enrolled in Nanjing’s Jinling College. In 1923, she studied at Park College and the University of Chicago as a foreign exchange student, earning a master's degree, and left to New York to study theology. In New York, she helped establish the Keunhwahoe, a patriotic Korean association for women, along with fellow exchange students Bak Indeok, Hwang Aedeok, among others.

Return to Korea and death
In 1933, she returned to Korea, but was prohibited from residing in the Seoul area and from teaching in any position outside of theology by Japanese authorities. She worked as a teacher at Martha Wilson Seminary, but the injuries sustained from torture resurfaced and she collapsed in her home. She died in 1944 in the Pyongyang Hospital. She was unmarried and left no relatives, and was cremated and her ashes were cast over the Daedong River.

See also 
Korean independence movement

Further reading
대한민국 국가보훈처, 이 달의 독립 운동가 상세자료 - 김마리아, 1998년
박용옥 (2003). 《김마리아: 나는 대한의 독립과 결혼하였다》. 서울: 홍성사.

References

Korean independence activists
Korean torture victims
1891 births
1944 deaths
Gwangsan Kim clan